Braathens, until 1998 known as Braathens SAFE, was a Norwegian scheduled and charter airline which operated between 1946 and 2004. The airline had 118 aircraft of 15 types, consisting of three or more models each from Douglas, Fokker and Boeing, as well as the de Havilland Heron and British Aerospace 146. The Boeing 737-200, with 20, was the most bought type. Braathens operated five variants of the 737, totaling 64 aircraft. Two aircraft were involved in hull-loss accidents.

History
The airline was founded by shipowner Ludvig G. Braathen and initially flew to destinations in Asia. The original fleet consisted of Douglas aircraft; these were first used for long-haul flights, but were gradually shifted for use in medium- and short-haul charter services. The airline started domestic services in 1954, with all its scheduled routes flown domestically until 1987. However, it continued to fly charter services from both Norway and Sweden, mostly to the Mediterranean. For Norwegian routes, Braathens first used a fleet of Herons, which were replaced with the Fokker F27 from 1958. The airline became the launch customer of the Fokker F28 in 1969 and also took delivery of Boeing 737-200 aircraft. The jet aircraft were at first used for charter, but later also for domestic services. All later deliveries would consist of Boeing aircraft, and after 1977 Braathens operated only jets. Between 1986 and 1989 the airline operated only the 737-200. By 1994, they had all been replaced with 737-400 and -500. Braathens entered the Swedish internal market in 1997 by purchasing Transwede and Malmö Aviation. This gave the airline a wider range of aircraft, including the 737-700, Fokker 100 and BAe 146. The losses suffered under a price war with Scandinavian Airlines (SAS) and Color Air in 1998 and 1999 caused the airline to be taken over by the SAS Group in 2001. Braathens and SAS Norway merged to form SAS Braathens in 2004.

Livery
From their establishment, Braathens SAFE's aircraft livery had a thick red and thinner white and blue cheatline, and the Flag of Norway on the vertical stabilizer. With only slight modifications, this general design was continued to and including the 737-400 and -500 aircraft. From 1997, Braathens SAFE took the new brand name of Braathens, and changed its corporate identity and livery, using a stylized grey wing as its logo. This resulted in a new livery with a blue belly, no cheatline and a blue vertical stabilizer with the stylized wing. The livery was introduced on the 737-700 and subsequently older aircraft were repainted. The design was changed again in 1999, when the logo on the vertical stabilizers was replaced with the Flag of Norway. Only some of the Douglas aircraft were named, and those that were, were called "Norse" followed by a description, such as Norse Commander and Norse Skyfarer. The Heron aircraft were given common Norwegian male names: Per, Ola, Pål and Lars. From the three last F27s, Braathens started naming their aircraft for kings of Norway. From the delivery of the F28s and 737s, all aircraft were thus named. Once aircraft were retired, the names were often reused on new aircraft.

Fleet
The following is a list of aircraft operated by Braathens between its inception in 1946 until the merger with SAS in 2004. The list excludes aircraft which were owned, but never operated by, Braathens, and aircraft which were never delivered, even though they were given registration codes. The former consists of a Cessna 206 Super Skywagon which was owned by Braathens SAFE, but operated by Bjørumfly between 1964 and 1966. The latter consists of a Douglas DC-6 which was never delivered in 1964. The list consists of the total number of aircraft operated by the airline (although the peak number operated may be lower), the year the type was first introduced, the year the last aircraft was taken out of service, and a description of the aircraft's use.

References

Citations

Bibliography
 

Aircraft
Braathens